Nimrud is an ancient city in modern Iraq.

Nimrud may also refer to:

Places
 Nimrud, Iran, a village in Bezenjan Rural District, in the Central District of Baft County, Kerman Province, Iran
 Nimrud, Tehran, better known as Namrud, a village in Shahrabad Rural District, in the Central District of Firuzkuh County, Tehran Province, Iran

People
 Nimrud Baito (born 1952), politician and minister in the Kurdistan Regional Government

See also
 Nimrud Slab, also known as the Calah Orthostat Slab, the top half of a "summary inscription" of the reign of Adad-nirari III
 Nimrud Tablet K.3751, also known as Kalhu Palace Summary Inscription 7 is an inscription on a clay tablet dated c.733 BC[1] from the reign of Tiglath-Pileser III
 Nimrud lens, also called Layard lens, a 3000-year-old piece of rock crystal
 Birs Nimrud, an archaeological site in Babylon Province, Iraq
 Nimrod (disambiguation)
 Nemrut (disambiguation)

Aramaic-language names